The Florentine Diamond is a lost diamond of Indian origin. It is light yellow in colour with very slight green overtones. It is cut in the form of an irregular (although very intricate) nine-sided 126-facet double rose cut, with a weight of 137.27 carats (27.454 g). The stone is also known as the Tuscan, the Tuscany Diamond, the Grand Duke of Tuscany, the Austrian Diamond, Austrian Yellow Diamond, and the Dufner Diamond.

History 

The stone's origins are disputed. Reportedly, it has been cut by Lodewyk van Bercken for Charles the Bold, Duke of Burgundy. Charles is said to have been wearing it when he fell in the Battle of Morat on 22 June 1476. A peasant or foot soldier found it on the Duke's person and sold it for 2 francs, thinking it was glass. The new owner Bartholomew May, a citizen of Bern, sold it to the Genoese, who sold it in turn to Ludovico Sforza. By way of the Fuggers it came into the Medici treasury at Florence. Pope Julius II is also named as one of its owners.

Another version of the stone's early history is that the rough stone was acquired in the late 16th century from the King of Vijayanagar in southern India by the Portuguese Governor of Goa, Ludovico Castro, Count of Montesanto. The crystal was deposited with the Jesuits in Rome until, after lengthy negotiations, Ferdinando I de' Medici, Grand Duke of Tuscany succeeded in buying it from the Castro-Noronha family for 35,000 Portuguese scudi crocati.

Duke Ferdinand's son, Cosimo II, finally entrusted his father's purchase to a cutter, Pompeo Studentoli, a Venetian working in Florence. The finished gem was delivered on 10 October 1615. An inventory drawn up on Cosimo's death confirms the acquisition of the rough diamond by Ferdinand and describes the gem as 'faceted on both sides and encircled by a diamond encrusted band'. It is also known as Dufner Diamond.

Documented history begins when Jean Baptiste Tavernier, the French jeweller and traveller, saw the stone among the possessions of Ferdinando II de' Medici, Grand Duke of Tuscany in 1657. It then passed into the hands of the Habsburgs when the last of the Medicis died through the marriage of Francis III Stephan of Lorraine to Empress Maria Theresa of Austria and was placed in the Habsburg Crown Jewels in the Hofburg in Vienna. At the time, it was valued at $750,000.

The diamond was set in a hat aigrette and displayed together with other crown jewels in the Imperial Treasury in display case XIII. In 1865 the diamond's weight and specificities were properly documented by Dr. Moritz Hoernes, head of the Imperial and Royal Court Mineral Cabinet. A plaster cast was also made. A rhinestone model was made at L. Saemann in Paris, with great care taken that the colour tone of the glass replica corresponded as closely as possible to the original stone. The colour of the Florentine was described as "wine mixed tenfold with water". This historic copy is kept at the Natural History Museum, Vienna.  

After the fall of the Austrian Empire after World War I, the stone by order of Emperor Charles I of Austria was removed from the Imperial Treasury and taken with him into exile. The stone was stolen some time after 1918 by a person close to the Imperial family and taken to South America with other gems of the Crown Jewels. After this, it was rumoured that the diamond was brought into the United States in the 1920s and was recut and sold.

The Florentine jeweller Paolo Penko recreated the diamond with Zirconium in a set as it appeared based on historical records and description when Archduchess Maria Maddalena of Austria (1589–1631) wore it. This is exhibited at the Palazzo Medici-Riccardi in Florence.

In literature
The Florentine Diamond plays a central role in Amy Meyerson's 2020 novel The Imperfects, the 2021 novel The Mists of Morne by Justin B. Hodder, as well as the 2022 novel Der rote Diamant (The Red Diamond) by Thomas Hürlimann.

See also
 List of diamonds

References

Further reading
 Shipley, Robert M. (1936). Important Diamonds of the World, pp. 15–18. Gemological Institute of America, USA, Vol. 2, No. 1 (Spring 1936)

External links

Yellow diamonds
Imperial Treasury, Vienna
Individual diamonds
Golconda diamonds
Stolen works of art